After Hours: Unplugged & Rewired is the first acoustic album from Arizona alternative metal band Digital Summer.  Being an unplugged rendition of their three studio albums, the album, which includes two new tracks ("This City" and "Demons"), was released on October 8, 2013.

Touring 
In support of the album, the band hosted a live acoustic performance for 300 people at The Roxy Lounge in Phoenix, Arizona supported by an unplugged show from Phoenix rock band Man Made Machine.

Critical reception 
With respect to the album, Morgan Rose from Sevendust said that "not many heavy rock bands can pull off acoustic album, but Digital Summer NAILED IT!"

Track listing 
This City - 4:43
Forget You [Explicit] - 3:21 
Shallow (Closer Than the Angels) - 4:01 
Suffocate - 3:58  
Closer to Me - 3:32
Dance in the Fire - 3:42
Morphine - 4:11
Use Me - 4:28
Whatever It Takes - 3:40
Demons - 4:35
Broken Halo - 4:09
Sweet Misery - 4:49
Worth the Pain - 5:57

References

External links 

Digital Summer albums
2013 albums